Ypthima albida, the silver ringlet or silvery ringlet, is a butterfly in the family Nymphalidae. It is found in Nigeria, Cameroon, Sudan, the Democratic Republic of the Congo, Uganda, Rwanda, Burundi, Kenya and Tanzania. Its habitat consists of wet grasslands and forest clearings and margins in submontane and montane areas.

Subspecies
The species may be divided into the following subspecies:

Ypthima albida albida (southern Sudan, eastern Democratic Republic of the Congo, Uganda, Rwanda, Burundi, western Kenya, north-western Tanzania)
Ypthima albida occidentalis Bartel, 1905 (eastern Nigeria, highlands of Cameroon)
Ypthima albida uniformis Bartel, 1905 (southern Democratic Republic of the Congo)

References

albida
Butterflies described in 1888
Butterflies of Africa
Taxa named by Arthur Gardiner Butler